Yury Bialou (born March 20, 1981 in Krychaw, Belarusian SSR) is a male shot putter from Belarus. His personal best throw is 21.14 metres, achieved in May 2003 in Minsk.

Achievements

References

1981 births
Living people
Belarusian male shot putters
Athletes (track and field) at the 2004 Summer Olympics
Athletes (track and field) at the 2008 Summer Olympics
Olympic athletes of Belarus
People from Krychaw
Sportspeople from Mogilev Region